Gerry Lively is a cinematographer and film director, known for directing Darkness Falls (1999), Dungeons & Dragons: Wrath of the Dragon God (2005) and Body Armour (2007).

Film work
As a director his early work was an Italian/American drama called  Hot steps - passi caldi released in 1990. The film starred Lindsley Allen and Nicole Kidman.
Lively directed the 2002 film Shattered Lies, a film about corrupt policemen and a man and a woman who are after 3 million dollars. It starred Frank Zagarino, Elizabeth Giordano and James Russo. He directed the horror film All Saints Eve, a film about a curse from the 1800s and a group of friends who have to find the cause of it before they become victims.

Filmography

Director
 All Saints Eve - 2015
 Dungeons & Dragons 3: The Book of Vile Darkness - 2012
 The Art of War III: Retribution - 2009
 Body Armour - 2007
 Dungeons & Dragons: Wrath of the Dragon God - 2005
 Shattered Lies  - 2002
 The Guardian - 2000
Darkness Falls - 1999
 Hot steps - passi caldi - 1990
Made for television
 Finish Line  - 2008  
 Windfall - 2003

References

External links

Year of birth missing (living people)
Living people
Place of birth missing (living people)
American cinematographers
American film directors